Periseius is a genus of mites in the family Ologamasidae. There are about five described species in Periseius.

Species
These five species belong to the genus Periseius:
 Periseius brasiliensis Hirschmann, 1966
 Periseius hammeni (Womersley, 1961)
 Periseius nobskae (Haq, 1965)
 Periseius plumosus Karg, 1994
 Periseius schusteri Hirschmann, 1966

References

Ologamasidae